The 1798–99 United States House of Representatives elections were held on various dates in various states between April 24, 1798 in New York and August 1, 1799 in Tennessee. Each state set its own date for its elections to the House of Representatives, with some after the official start of the 6th United States Congress on March 4, 1799, but before the start of the first session of this Congress in Philadelphia on December 2, 1799. These elections were held during President John Adams term. It was the last congressional session before the move to the new capital at Washington, D.C. Elections were held for all 106 seats, representing 16 states.

President Adams, a Federalist elected two years prior in the election of 1796, remained popular during a time of national economic growth, and the Federalists made a modest gain of three seats at the expense of the opposition Democratic-Republicans, the party of Vice President and future President Thomas Jefferson.  This resulted in an increased Federalist majority in the House, 60-46 seats.

The Federalist party squandered its popularity by passing a series of controversial new laws in the summer of 1798, including the Naturalization Act of 1798 and the Alien and Sedition Acts.  Their passage seriously injured the chances of President Adams and Federalist congressional candidates in the elections of 1800.

The House that met during this Congress would ultimately elect Thomas Jefferson over Aaron Burr in the presidential election of 1800.

Election summaries

Special elections 

There were special elections in 1798 and 1799 during the 5th United States Congress and 6th United States Congress.

Elections are sorted here by date then district.

5th Congress

6th Congress

Connecticut

Delaware

Georgia

Kentucky

Maryland

Massachusetts 

Massachusetts required a majority for election.

New Hampshire

New Jersey 

New Jersey switched to district representation for this election.  The districts were not numbered at the time, but are retroactively numbered here as 1–5.  New Jersey would go back to an  the following election.

New York 

Between the 1796 and 1798 elections, New York re-districted.  This marked the first time that its districts were numbered.

North Carolina

Northwest Territory 
See Non-voting delegates, below.

Pennsylvania

Rhode Island 

Rhode Island used at-large districts, but elected the candidates on separate tickets instead of using a general ticket.

South Carolina

Tennessee

Vermont 

Majority vote required to win, necessitating a run-off election in the 1st (Western) district.

Virginia

Non-voting delegates 

|-
! 
| colspan=3 | New seat
|  | New seat created.New delegate elected October 3, 1799.New delegate had no known party.
| nowrap | 
|}

See also
 1798 United States elections
 List of United States House of Representatives elections (1789–1822)
 1798–99 United States Senate elections
 5th United States Congress
 6th United States Congress

Notes

References

Bibliography

External links
 Office of the Historian (Office of Art & Archives, Office of the Clerk, U.S. House of Representatives)